United Arab Republic containing Egypt and Syria participated at the 1959 Mediterranean Games held in Beirut, Lebanon.

United Arab Republic medals by sport

References

External links
 https://web.archive.org/web/20130728091203/http://www.cijm.org.gr/images/stories/pdf/JM1959.pdf

Mediterranean Games
Mediterranean Games
Nations at the 1959 Mediterranean Games
Egypt at the Mediterranean Games
Syria at the Mediterranean Games